is a defunct Japanese software house. Thanks to the efforts of entrepreneur and computer engineer Yoichiro Hirano, the company evolved from the "MyCon Club" into a real business in 1981. As Carry Lab, the company developed popular word processing software and computer and video games. They also ported popular Taito titles such as Chack'n Pop to Japanese computers. One of their games, Hao-kun no Fushigi na Tabi, did make it to North American shores as Mystery Quest for the Nintendo Entertainment System. The game, published by Taxan, was cut and reduced in difficulty.

Carry Lab's funding system was not set up well, and the programmers didn't see eye to eye with the sales managers, so the company's core team left in 1986. Afterwards, Carry Lab joined the Disk Original Group, a collective publishing house for Famicom Disk System games set up by Square Co. Carry Lab survived for a few years afterwards re-releasing their old games.

Games

External links
RetroPC.NET Carry Lab Page

Defunct video game companies of Japan
Video game companies established in 1981
Video game development companies
Video game publishers